"The Heart" and "Difference Maker" (styled "The Heart + Difference Maker") are the two lead singles from Needtobreathe's fifth studio album Rivers in the Wasteland. It was released on January 14, 2014, by Atlantic Records, Word Records and Curb Records, and the songs were written by Bear and Bo Rinehart. The band Needtobreate performed "The Heart" on Conan (February 20, 2014), The Ellen DeGeneres Show (April 18, 2014), Late Show with David Letterman (April 23, 2014), and CBS This Morning: Saturday (May 3, 2014),

Track listing

Weekly Charts

The Heart

Difference Maker

References 
 

2014 singles
2014 songs
Needtobreathe songs
Atlantic Records singles
Curb Records singles